There's a Flower in My Pedal is a Canadian short film, directed by Andrea Dorfman and released in 2005. Blending live action and animation in a collage style, the film is a poetic meditation on facing up to fear and insecurity, inspired in part by a childhood memory of her mother never riding her beloved bicycle again in her lifetime after sustaining a minor injury from falling off of it.

The film premiered at the 2005 Toronto International Film Festival, where it received an honorable mention from the jury for the Toronto International Film Festival Award for Best Canadian Short Film.

References

External links

2005 films
2005 animated films
2005 short films
Canadian animated short films
Films directed by Andrea Dorfman
2000s English-language films
2000s Canadian films